Gülşehir Salt Mine, officially named "Turkey 2023", is an underground salt mine located at Tuzköy village in Gülşehir district of Nevşehir Province, Central Anatolia Region, Turkey.

The salt mine is located in the "Hacı Bektaş Salt Basin" about  far from Nevşehir. The estimated size of the reserve is 2.5 billion tonnes.
It is reported that salt mining works have been carried out at site since the late Seljuk Empire era, around eight centuries ago. More than 50 people are employed in the mine. Salt rock is mined by a tunnel boring machine and transported to the surface by trucks. The raw salt is processed in several refinement operations before it reaches a commercial quality. Annual production is 150,000 tonnes in average worth of  15 million (approx. US$ 2  million as of September 2020).

The current operator Suat Bilgin told in an interview that he leased the salt mine in 2006 after a tender offer for a time period of 99 years.

References

Salt mines in Turkey
Underground mines in Turkey
Gülşehir District
Economy of Nevşehir Province